Rosli Dhobi (18 March 1932 – 2 March 1950) was a Sarawakian nationalist from Sibu of mixed Malay-Melanau descent during the British crown colony era in that state.

He was a member leader of the Rukun 13, an active organisation in the anti-cession movement of Sarawak, along with Morshidi Sidek, Awang Rambli Bin Deli and Bujang Suntong. It was a secret cell organisation, composed of nationalists, which carried out assassinations of officers of the British colonial government in Sarawak. He was well known for his assassination of Duncan George Stewart, the second governor of colonial Sarawak, in 1949.

Early life
Rosli Dhobi was born on 18 March 1932 at No. 94, Kampung Pulo in Sibu, the second child in the washerman family. His father, Dhobi bin Buang originated from Indonesia and was a descendant of Raden. His mother, Habibah binti Haji Lamit came from a Sambas family and settled for a long time in Mukah. Little is known about his earlier life although friends regard Rosli as an approachable person despite his quietness. He had an elder sister and a younger brother: Fatimah (born 1927) and Ainie (born 1934).

Rosli started his career as a teacher and left his job in 1947 to teach in Sibu People's School. Before that, he worked at the Sarawak Public Works Department (PWD) and for Utusan Sarawak. Rosli was known to be a nationalist and a poet. Using the nickname Lidros, Rosli wrote a nationalistic poem titled "Panggilan Mu yang Suchi" (Malay: "Your Divine Call") which was published in Utusan Sarawak on 28 February 1948. The usage of nicknames was prevalent at the time since the British Colonial Authority vigorously monitored any attempts to spread words against them. He joined the Sibu Malay Youth Movement (Malay: Pergerakan Pemuda Melayu Sibu) under the leadership of Sirat Haji Yaman.

Rosli joined Rukun 13 in August 1948. He was introduced to the organisation by an old friend, Awang Rambli.

One of Rukun 13's aims was to establish a union of Sarawak with newly independent Indonesia. Besides, Sukarno, the first president of Indonesia was highly regarded by the Sarawak Malays. Posters of Sukarno were found to decorate Malay houses in Sarawak. Tahar Johnny, a cousin of Rosli, denied that Rosli was pro-Indonesia despite the latter taking a liking to anything Indonesian, and other members of Rukun 13 may have been pro-Indonesia.

Assassination of Duncan George Stewart

Background
The end of the Second World War had brought an end to the Brooke Dynasty rule in Sarawak; believing it to be in the best interest of the people of Sarawak, Rajah Vyner Brooke ceded the state to the British Crown. Sarawak became a Crown Colony, ruled from the Colonial Office in London, which in turn dispatched a Governor for Sarawak.

This move was opposed by Rajah Muda Anthony Brooke, who was supposed to become the next Rajah Brooke, as well as many native Sarawakians who were initially told that they would be allowed self-government. Anthony Brooke became the leader of the anti-cession movement.

Events
On 3 December 1949, Duncan George Stewart, the aforementioned appointed governor of Sarawak, was murdered by Rukun 13 members including Rosli, Awang Ramli Amit Mohd Deli, Morshidi Sidek and Bujang Suntong in Sibu.

Rosli and Morshidi were among the crowd that welcomed the governor on his arrival in Sibu. After inspecting an honour guard the governor was meeting a group of local school children in near proximity of Rosli. Morshidi began to pretend to take pictures of the governor with a broken camera. The governor stopped to allow Morshidi to photograph him. At that moment, Rosli stabbed the governor.

Rosli was arrested on the spot and sent to Kuching for trial and later into imprisonment. Despite suffering a deep stab wound Stewart is reported to have tried to carry on until blood began to seep through his white uniform. The governor was flown back to Kuching for treatment and later to Singapore, where he died a week after the incident.

Death
After a few months languishing in prison, Rosli Dhobi, Awang Ramli Amit Mohd Deli, Morshidi Sidek and Bujang Suntong were found guilty of murder and sentenced to death on 4 December 1949. This move was criticised by many, as Rosli was a juvenile at the time of assassination.

Rosli was subsequently hanged on the morning of 2 March 1950 at the Kuching prison. Fearing the resentment of the local population, the British government did not allow Rosli's body to leave the prison. Instead, his body was interred in an unmarked grave within the prison compound.

After Sarawak joined Malaysia on 16 September 1963, a tombstone was put in place at his grave near the Islamic Heritage Museum.

Aftermath

Sarawak was sent into tumultuous years, and the anti-cessionists' rebellion was crushed as the support by the locals dwindled due to Rosli's "aggressive" tactics, alongside opposition from some of the Malay leaders who were pro-British. Most of the anti-cessionists were arrested and later sent to prison, some in Changi Prison in Singapore. However, things later returned to normal, and peace was restored during the era of the 3rd Governor of Sarawak, Sir Anthony Foster Abell. Even those who were imprisoned at Changi were allowed to return to Sarawak, to continue their sentence at Kuching Central Prison.

In 1961, Tunku Abdul Rahman, the prime minister of Malaya at that time, was trying to promote his plan for the formation of greater Malaysia in Sibu. He became interested on the story of Rosli Dhoby. Tunku then discussed with chief minister of Sarawak, Abdul Taib Mahmud, to build a heroes monument near the Sarawak State Museum. On 29 November 1990, the laying of foundation stone for the heroes monument was done by Tunku and Taib Mahmud. Apart from Rosli Dhoby, names other individuals such as Datuk Merpati Jepang, Rentap, Datuk Patinggi Ali, including Tunku Abdul Rahman himself were imortalised here.

In 1975, Dr Mahathir Mohamad, minister of education at that time, changed the name of SMK Bandar Sibu to SMK Rosli Dhobi to commemorate the sacrifices of Rosli Dhobi.

After 46 years resting in the prison compound, the remains of Rosli Dhobi were moved out of the Kuching Central Prison to be buried in the Sarawak's Heroes Mausoleum near An Nur Mosque in his hometown of Sibu on 2 March 1996. He was given a state funeral by the Sarawak government.

In 2009, Malaysian television provider Astro screened a miniseries titled Warkah Terakhir ("The Final Letter") which described the story of Rosli Dhoby. The miniseries was produced by Wan Hasliza with actor Beto Kusyairy portraying Rosli Dhoby. However, Rosli Dhobi heir Lucas Johnny claimed that the series contained several factual errors. For example, the miniseries portrayed Rosli Dhobi as trying to run away after stabbing the governor. In reality, Rosli was trying to stab the governor the second time but was stopped by the governor's bodyguards.

In 2012, a declassified document from the British National Archives showed that Anthony Brooke had no connection with the assassination of Stewart and that the British government had known this at the time. The British government decided to keep this information a secret as the assassins were found to be agitating for union with newly independent Indonesia. The British government did not want to provoke Indonesia which had only recently won its war of independence from the Netherlands, as the British was busy dealing with the Malayan Emergency.

Research
Researches and writings on the history of Rosli Dhoby and Rukun 13 has been lacking because of low awareness and interests in the subject. Besides, from 1949 to 1996, the Sarawak public generally regarded the struggle of Rosli and Rukun 13 negatively as a "bad guy", "imposter", and "rebel". Only after Sarawak state government has given a formal state funeral to Rosli and his friends in 1996, the public perception started to change to the positive side. There are limited primary records regarding Rosli and Rukun 13 as the formal members of the Rukun 13 did not document their experience in view of their struggle looks bad in the public eyes. The last Rukun 13 member passed away in 2009. However, several of the Pergerakan Pemuda Melayu (PPM) (Young Malays Movement) members still available in 2009. Deputy director of Sarawak state prison, Sabu Hassan, in a formal reply written to Nordi Achie, a researcher working at Centre for the Promotion of Knowledge and Language Learning, Universiti Malaysia Sabah, stated that Malaysian prison department did not keep any record and files for the four offenders while a portion of the documents were destroyed by the British during the colonial times.

In 2013, Jeniri Amir, a professor from Universiti Malaysia Sarawak specialising in political communication, wrote a book about Rosli Dhobi which included new information. However, according to a book review written by Nordi Achie, Jeniri's book contained errors with only superficial analysis of newly found information regarding Rosli Dhoby.

See also
 Anti-cession movement of Sarawak
 Rentap, an Iban warrior who fought against Brooke
 James W.W. Birch, first Perak resident who was killed by Dato Maharajalela Lela

References

Sources
 Adapted from Sabah dan Sarawak Menjadi Tanah Jajahan British, Sejarah Tingkatan 3 textbook
 Adapted from Pembinaan Negara Dan Bangsa Malaysia, Sejarah Tingkatan 5 textbook 

1932 births
1950 deaths
People from Sarawak
Malaysian people of Malay descent
History of Sarawak
Melanau people
Malaysian rebels
Executed Malaysian people
People executed by British Sarawak by hanging
Malaysian people convicted of murder
Malaysian assassins
20th-century executions by the United Kingdom
Executed assassins
Assassins of heads of government
People from British Borneo